Mark Thomas Maybury (born December 13, 1964) is an American computer scientist and administrator who is currently the Chief Technology Officer of Stanley Black & Decker. Previously he was 
at the MITRE Corporation, joining them in 1987, and serving as Executive Director from 1998-2010. A former Air Force officer, he was also the Chief Scientist of the United States Air Force, Washington, D.C., from 2010 to 2013, where he was scientific adviser to the Chief of Staff of the Air Force and Secretary of the U.S. Air Force, providing assessments on a wide range of scientific and technical issues affecting the Air Force mission.

Maybury has been an editor or co-author of 10 books and 60 refereed publications. He is an IEEE Fellow and has been awarded several U.S. patents.

Education
Maybury received his Bachelor of Arts degree in mathematics from College of the Holy Cross (Fenwick Scholar, valedictorian) in 1986, a master's degree in computer speech and language processing from Cambridge University, England (Rotary Scholar) in 1987, a Masters of Business Administration from Rensselaer Polytechnic Institute in 1989, and a doctoral degree in artificial intelligence, also from Cambridge University in 1991.

References

Sources

Chief Scientists of the United States Air Force
Rensselaer Polytechnic Institute alumni
Living people
1964 births
Fellows of the Association for the Advancement of Artificial Intelligence
Fellow Members of the IEEE
Chelmsford High School alumni